Mesotherium ("Middle Beast") is an extinct genus of mesotheriid, a long-lasting family of superficially rodent-like, burrowing notoungulates from South America. It one of the youngest notoungulates, and the last known member of Typotheria. It was first named by Étienne Serres in 1867, and through further finds now contains four species, M. cristatum, M. hystatum, M. maendrum, and M. pachygnathum. Fossils have been found in Argentina, dating to the Early-Middle Pleistocene.

Etymology 
Serres named Mesotherium so due to his belief that it was an intermediate between rodents and pachyderms (or ungulates), due to its large upper incisors, and its size and proportions. "Serres—by a happy inspiration proposed calling it Mesotherium—as being a common centre towards which all mammalia got happily confounded," Hugh Falconer wrote Darwin in April 1863. "Bravard sent it home under the name of Typotherium as being the central type from which all mammals diverged." It was Serres' view that there was only one underlying animal type.

Despite Serres' having officially named the genus Mesotherium, it was known from the late 19th century to the early 20th century under the name "Typotherium",  given it by the French palaeontologist living in Argentina, Auguste Bravard; under this name, Bravard sent the skull he found to Paris, which led to the family being named "Typotheriidae", and served as the basis for the order Typotheria. As the name Mesotherium had been published earlier in the same year as Typotherium, Mesotherium was declared the valid name of the genus, (Simpson, 1980) and Mesotheriidae the valid name of the family. Nevertheless, as the rules do not apply to anything above the family, the name of the order Typotheria is still in use, but refers to a wider range of rodent-like notoungulates.

Description 

Like most rodents, it had superficially long upper incisors, which met at the tips, however, it had enamel on both the labial and lingual surfaces of the incisors, while rodents only have enamel on the labial surface. The lower incisors of Mesotherium were reminiscent of those of a rabbit's.

The ankle joint of Mesotherium was made up of a "ball-and-socket" arrangement between the astralagus and the navicular, as well as a sliding articulation of the calcaneocuboid joint, which would cause extension-flexion in the ankle, as well as supination-pronation of the foot. Because of this, Florentino Ameghino predicted in 1905, and confirmed in 1906 that Mesotherium would have a great toe.

Mesotherium was likely fossorial, in that it dug, possibly to find food.

Chronology 
The youngest known specimen of the genus dates to around 220,000 years ago.

References

Further reading 
 The Origin and Evolution of Mammals (Oxford Biology) by T. S. Kemp
 Horns, Tusks, and Flippers: The Evolution of Hoofed Mammals By Donald R. Prothero, Robert M. Schoch Published 2003 JHU Press 
 Forms of Animal Life: A Manual of Comparative Anatomy By George Rolleston, William Hatchett Jackson Published 1888 Clarendon Press
 The Century Dictionary: An Encyclopedic Lexicon of the English Language By William Dwight Whitney. Published 1890 The Century Company; original from Harvard University.
 Classification of Mammals Above the Species Level: Above the Species Level By Malcolm C. McKenna, Susan K. Bell, George Gaylord Simpson. Published 1997 Columbia University Press. 
 Neanderthals Revisited: New Approaches and Perspectives By Katerina Harvati, Terry Harrison. Publisher Springer

External links 
 Mesotherium in the Paleobiology Database
 Illustration of the head of a Mesotherium
 New Mesotheriidae (Mammalia, Notoungulata, Typotheria),geochronology and tectonics of the Caragua area, northernmost Chile

Typotheres
Prehistoric placental genera
Pleistocene mammals of South America
Ensenadan
Pleistocene Argentina
Fossils of Argentina
Fossil taxa described in 1867
Quaternary Argentina